Dane Key is an American football wide receiver for the Kentucky Wildcats.

Early life and high school
Key grew up in Lexington, Kentucky and attended Frederick Douglass High School. As a senior, he caught 53 passes for 959 yards and nine touchdowns and won the Paul Hornung Award as the best high school football player in Kentucky. Key committed to play college football at Kentucky over offers from Michigan, Oregon, South Carolina, and Western Kentucky.

College career
Key joined the Kentucky Wildcats as an early enrollee. He entered his freshman season as a starter at wide receiver.

Personal life
Key's father, Donte Key, played linebacker at Kentucky. His older brother, Devon, played at Western Kentucky and is a member of the Denver broncos

References

External links
Kentucky Wildcats bio

Living people
Players of American football from Kentucky
American football wide receivers
Kentucky Wildcats football players
Sportspeople from Lexington, Kentucky
Year of birth missing (living people)